Owain ap Hywel ("Owen son of Howell") may refer to:

 Owain ap Hywel (Glywysing) or Owain ap Hywel ap Rhys, a 9th- & 10th-century king of Glywysing
 Owain ap Hywel Dda or Owain ap Hywel ap Cadell, a 10th-century king of Deheubarth